Miss South Sudan or Miss World South Sudan is a Beauty pageant in South Sudan.

History
The Miss World qualifying pageant launched in 2011, the year South Sudan gained independence from Sudan. What began with 20 applicants from around the country and the diaspora has now grown to about 60.

The first round of auditions for this year's event will begin in the coming weeks, with the winner to be announced in August. The new Miss South Sudan will compete for the global title of Miss World.

Titleholders 

The winner of Miss South Sudan represents her country at Miss World. On occasion, when the winner does not qualify (due to age) for either contest, a runner-up is sent.

See also
 Miss Earth South Sudan

References

South Sudan
South Sudan
South Sudanese awards